Crime statistics in the United Kingdom refers to the data collected in the United Kingdom, and that collected by the individual areas, England and Wales, Scotland and Northern Ireland, which operate separate judicial systems. It covers data related to crime in the United Kingdom. As with crime statistics elsewhere, they are broadly divided into victim studies and police statistics. More recently, third-party reporting is  used to quantify specific under-reported issues, for example, hate crime.

Crime surveys

The Crime Survey for England and Wales is an attempt to measure both the amount of crime, and the impact of crime on England and Wales. The original survey (carried out in 1982, to cover the 1981 year) covered all three judicial areas of the UK, and was therefore referred to as the British Crime Survey, but now it only covers England and Wales. In Scotland and Northern Ireland, similar surveys, namely the Scottish Crime and Victimisation Survey and Northern Ireland Crime Survey have similar purposes. These surveys collect information about the victims of crime, the circumstances surrounding the crime, and the behaviour of the perpetrators. They are used to plan, and measure the results of, crime reduction or perception measures. In addition, they collect data about the perception of issues such as antisocial behaviour and the criminal justice system.

Other crime surveys include the Commercial Victimisation Survey, which covers small and medium-sized businesses, and the Offending, Crime and Justice Survey, with a particular focus on young people.

Background and counting rules
Until the late 1990s crime figures for varying crime types were not released to the general public at individual police force level. The annual publication 'Crime in England & Wales' produced by the Home Office began to break the figures down to a smaller area in 1996. Crime figures in England & Wales during the late 1990s and early 2000s were often misinterpreted in the media and scrutinised because of frequent changes in the way crimes were counted and recorded that lead to rises in the crime category 'Violence Against the Person'.

Commenting on figures from 1 April 1998 onwards, the then-Home Secretary Jack Straw said "changes in the way crime statistics are compiled are in line with recommendations by senior police officers. They are intended to give a more accurate picture of the level of offences". The largest increases were recorded in the "Violence Against the Person" category owing to the inclusion of common assault figures to accompany other offence types within this category that include assault occasioning actual bodily harm, grievous bodily harm, harassment, murder, possession of offensive weapons and a selection of other low volume violent crimes grouped together by the Metropolitan Police as 'other violence'.

The change in counting rules, and the significant impact it had on violence against the person figures, was often misconstrued by the media as real increases. The rises in violence resulting from this were highly publicised on an annual basis.

Today crime figures are made available nationally at Local Authority and Ward level. The Metropolitan Police have made detailed crime figures, broken down by category at borough and ward level, available on their website since 2000. Many websites and applications took advantage of this data to build crime maps of London's neighbourhoods. Recorded crime rates in the UK include threats and cases where no physical violence was used so are hard to compare with international statistics, and because even large-scale victim surveys are national rather than local the only available breakdown by borough is from recorded crime, largely calls for service from the police which do not necessarily reflect underlying levels of crime.

A detailed breakdown of the way crimes are counted are available from the Home Office website. Recorded crime increased in England and Wales during most of the 1980s, reaching a peak in 1992, and then fell each year until 1998/99 when the changes in the Counting Rules resulted in an increase in recorded offences. This was followed by the introduction of the National Crime Recording Standard (NCRS) in April 2002 which led to a rise in recording in 2002/03 and 2003/04, as the rules bedded-in within forces. Crime figures were originally collected to cover a calendar year, however this changed from 1998 when crime statistics began to be collated and grouped by financial year.

Police statistics
The accuracy of police statistics is questionable. Crimes are under-reported, as victims may be reluctant to report them due to considering it too trivial, embarrassing, aversion to dealing with the police, or fear of repercussions by the perpetrators. The police also sometimes fail to record correctly all crimes reported to them. The police may not accept a person’s claim that they are a victim of crime, or sometimes deliberately do not record a crime to save time or manipulate performance figures.

In 2002,  the Home Office introduced a National Crime Recording Standard in England and Wales, due to a lack of uniformity in how police forces recorded notifiable offences. The National Crime Recording Standard was applied inconsistently across crimes and regions, frequently incorrectly, for instance, it varied significantly by area: in the year to March 2011, 2% of reported rapes in Gloucestershire were recorded as "no crime", while 30% of reported rapes in Kent were so classified, making accurate comparison difficult. This was sometimes due to pressure from performance and other factors. During the period November 2012 – October 2013, an average of 19% of crimes reported to the police are not recorded, with one quarter of sexual crimes and one-third of violent crimes not being recorded, with rape being particularly bad at 37% 'no-criming'. Reporting is inconsistent across local forces: "In a few forces, crime-recording is very good, and shows that it can be done well and the statistics can be trusted. In some other forces, it is unacceptably bad." The failure to properly record crime was called "inexcusably poor" and "indefensible" by Her Majesty’s Chief Inspector of Constabulary Tom Winsor. Twenty percent of reviewed decisions to cancel a report were found to be incorrect, and in about a quarter of cases there was no record of victims being informed that their report had been cancelled.

Senior members of the policing establishment admit to long-term, widespread "fiddling" of figures, such as John Stevens, Baron Stevens of Kirkwhelpington, former head of the Metropolitan Police Service:

In April 2013, the framework for reporting of official police statistics was amended to address these issues. The Home Office delegated the responsibility for auditing a police forces compliance with the National Crime Recording Standard to Her Majesty's Chief Inspectorate of Constabulary, later renamed Her Majesty's Inspectorate of Constabulary and Fire Rescue Service. The first statistics using  the new framework were published in July 2014. After the 2014 changes, five yearly rolling compliance audits by Her Majesty's Inspectorate of Constabulary and Fire Rescue Service found that police force still do not uniformly comply with The National Crime Recording Standards. In 2014, the Office of National Statistics stated that the unreliability of notifiable offence statistics meant they did not meet the quality standards required of national statistics.

England and Wales
English criminal law details a series of criminal acts, and when these should apply. English courts apply criminal statutes and common law as part of their responsibility for applying justice and dealing with the culprits.

According to the Home Office, there were around "1.3 million violent crimes in England and Wales in 2017, which can be misconstrued, because the United Kingdom uses a less lenient view of violent crime, which wouldn't be reported in North America. This makes England and Wales worse than Denmark, Australia, Japan, but much safer than France, United States, Canada, Belgium.". This has not changed in 2018, with figures remaining close to 2017's according to the CSEW, however a 6% decrease in offences with a knife or sharp instrument was seen in 2018, with recorded figures at 40,829. Other areas of crime in 2018 included robbery (82,566), an 11% increase from 2017; burglary (424,846), a 3% decrease from 2017; and vehicle theft (463,497), a 2% increase from 2017.

The strength of the police force, as of 2018, in England and Wales was around 125,651 of whom 37,104 are women. 25,700 children above the age of criminal responsibility, 10, and beneath majority, 18, were found guilty of indictable offences in 2017, and a further 13,500 cautioned  England and Wales has a prison population of over 75,000 (2018 estimate) and 3000 with home curfew. Around £2.7 billion is spent on the prison service of England and Wales each year.

In 2010, ATM crime cost the UK a total of £33.2 million – just over 8 percent of total card fraud. According to the British Crime Survey, 6.4 percent of plastic card users reported being victim to fraud during 2009-10.

Robberies are rising more rapidly in England and Wales than in France, but still not nearly as much as Canada or the United States.  Largescale smartphones use and reduction in police patrols are blamed.  After 2014 robberies rose by 33%.  Police are under pressure since 21,000 officers were cut from 2010 to 2018, only 7% of robbery cases lead to a suspect being charged in 2019 while 21% lead to a charge four years before 2019.

Recorded knife crime rose by 7% from just above 41,000 in the year to June 2018 to just above 44,000 in the year to June 2019, knifepoint rapes, robberies and assaults logged by police continued to rise.  Javed Khan of Barnardo's said over the ONS statistics, “Knife crime is a symptom of a much wider, complex problem. Too many young people are suffering a ‘poverty of hope’, facing a future with no qualifications, no job prospects, and no role models.”  Robberies rose by 11% and fraud rose by 15%, gun crime also rose to 6734 incidents.  The Crime Survey for England and Wales that takes account of offences not reported to police, also show a continuing rise in fraud, it suggested 3,863,000 fraud offences occurred during the year to June 2019.   The proportion of cases solved dropped from 15.5% in 2015 to 7.4% in 2019, which is a record low. Across England and Wales, the percentage of solved burglaries almost halved during the seven years preceding 2021, from 32,000 out of 342,043 cases (9.5%) in 2014-2015 to 14,000 out of 268,000 cases (5.4%) in 2021-2022.

Scotland
Scots criminal law is separate to English criminal law, including the use of a not proven verdict at criminal trials in the Courts of Scotland. The list of offences is also different from England and Wales, and Northern Ireland.

In 2007–8, there were 114 homicide victims in Scotland, a slight decrease on the previous year. In the third quarter of 2009, there were a little over 17,000 full time equivalent serving police officers. There were around 375,000 crimes in 2008–9, a fall of 2% on the previous year. These included around 12,500 non-sexual violent acts, 168,000 crimes of dishonesty (housebreaking, theft and shoplifting are included in this category) and 110,000 acts of fire-raising and vandalism. In the 2008–9 period, there was a prison population in Scotland of about 7,300, equating to 142 people per 100,000 population, very similar to England and Wales. Spending on Scotland's prisons was around £350 million in 2007–8.

Northern Ireland

Between April 2008 and 2009, there were just over 110,000 crimes recorded by the Police Service of Northern Ireland, an increase of 1.5% on the previous year. Northern Ireland has around 7,500 serving full-time equivalent police positions, and a prison population of 1,500, 83 per 100,000 of the population, lower than the rest of the UK.

External links
Crime Survey for England and Wales

References

Crime in the United Kingdom